Composition No. 96 is an album by composer Anthony Braxton featuring his title piece, dedicated to Karlheinz Stockhausen, performed by a 37-piece orchestra and recorded in 1981 and originally released on the Leo label in 1989.

Reception

The Allmusic review by Brian Olewnick stated: "For confirmed Braxaholics, Composition 96 is a must-have, if only for its historical significance in his career. Listeners familiar with his jazz work, however, may be put off by its relatively severe classical orientation, lack of improvisation, and absence of overt themes."

Track listing
 "Composition No. 96" - 55:35

Personnel
The Composers and Improvisors Orchestra conducted by Anthony Braxton
Denise Pool, Rebecca Morgan, Nancy Hargerud - flute
Aileen Munger, Laurri Uhlig - oboe
Bob Davis - English horn
Marlene Weaver - bassoon
Bill Smith - E♭clarinet
Paul Pearse - B♭clarinet
Ray Downey - bass clarinet
Denny Goodhew  - alto saxophone
Richard Reed - French horn
Dave Scott, James Knapp - trumpet
Julian Priester, Scott Reeves - trombone
Rick Byrnes - tuba
Julian Smedley, Mathew Pederson, Jeannine Davis, Libby Poole, Jeroen van Tyn, Sandra Guy, Becky Liverzey, Mary Jacobson - violin
Betty Agent, Jean Word, Sam Williams, Beatrice Dolf - viola
Page Smith-Weaver, Scott Threlkold - cello
Scott Weaver, Deborah de Loria - bass
Motter Dean - harpsichord
Ed Hartman, Matt Kocmieroski - percussion

References

Leo Records albums
Anthony Braxton albums
1989 albums